In Iceland, vehicle registration plates are issued by the Icelandic Transport Authority and are made in the state penitentiary. The plates are made of aluminium with reflective base and embossed characters.

The current registration system uses three letters and two digits or two letters and three digits in Helvetica Neue. The plates are issued randomly, they are not issued sequentially and they do not have any geographic coding. There are no special letters or number series for special vehicle types (this may vary depending on type of plates, see chart below.)

The registration system was introduced on 1 January 1989. All vehicles changed to it (an exception was made for antique cars that keep the district system) and keep the same registration number for life. If a vehicle is, e.g., changed to commercial vehicle it gets commercial plates but they have the same registration number. All plates in the new system have validation stickers in the middle that indicate the year the vehicle is due for safety inspection.

Vanity plates are allowed that do not conflict with the new system. Some use it for their old district plate number but must use the new design, except for antique vehicles.

The plates are available in 4 sizes:

Cars have 3 sizes: European standard , North American standard  and European square .

History
An older decentralized district plate system was used 1938 until 31 December 1988 (see below).

From 1989 to 2007 the system consisted of two letters and three digits. In 2007 the system ran out of combinations and the first digit was changed to a letter on newer vehicles.

Early 2004 a country identifier (IS) and the Icelandic flag was added on the left side of all standard plates. The country identifier is mandatory and all plates issued between 1989 and 2004 are required to get a national identifier sticker so they look like the new plates, although this law is not widely enforced.

Safety inspection
The law requires owners to keep their motor vehicle in safe operating condition. All vehicles registered in Iceland are required to pass a periodic safety inspection.

The frequency of inspection depends on the age of the car. A new car is due for its first safety inspection after 4 years, then again after 2 years until it reaches 8 years old from when an inspection is required every year (4-2-2-1). A sticker to indicate the year is usually placed in the middle after the first two letters. Antique cars (over 25 years old) that are registered as antique vehicles require an inspection every second year, based on the year of first registration (a car initially registered in an odd year will require and inspection every odd year and a car first registered in an even year every even year.)

The last digit on the plate indicates the month for inspection (e.g., 1 for January through 0 for October). As the plates are issued randomly some cars are due for their first inspection after 4 years and 10 months and other cars after only 3 years and 1 month. While this system means no cars are listed as being due in November and December there is a 2-month grace period where a vehicle can be inspected up to 2 months after the due date without penalty i.e. a car with a license plate ending in 0 can be inspected as late as December without penalty. Vehicles are also allowed to be inspected up to 6 months before they are due although it is not possible to do so if it is still the previous year i.e. a car with a license plate ending in 8 can be inspected as early as February whereas a car with a license plate ending in 2 can only be inspected as early as January.

There are 4 possible outcomes for an inspection. The car may pass "without notes" which means that there was nothing found during the inspection at all. A car may pass but with notices which means that components are either worn or inoperative but either they are still serviceable or that particular component cannot fail a vehicle in inspection. If a vehicle fails a safety inspection but the car is still deemed safe to drive a sticker is placed over the current inspection sticker, green in even years and half green, half orange in odd years, indicating that the vehicle has failed inspection and the month that the re-inspection is due. The owner has until the end of the following month to repair any items that failed inspection and present the vehicle for a re-inspection. If a fault is found that deems the vehicle unsafe to drive or there is other illegal issues (e.g. error in the registration, illegal lighting etc.) the car will fail inspection and will be given a red sticker that says "Akstur bönnuð" which means driving prohibited and the vehicle must not be driven on public roads until the issues have been rectified.

Type of plates
The colour of the license plate varies depending on the purpose of the vehicle (see chart below.)

Old district plates
This system was used from 1938 until 31 December 1988 and consisted of a black plate with silver letters. The first letter denominated the district (except for military related) where the plate was issued as follows:

A: Akureyrarkaupstaður og Eyjafjarðarsýsla
B: Barðastrandarsýsla
D: Dalasýsla
E: Akraneskaupstaður
F: Siglufjarðarkaupstaður
G: Hafnarfjarðarkaupstaður og Gullbringu- og Kjósarsýsla
H: Húnavatnssýsla
Í: Ísafjarðarkaupstaður og Ísafjarðarsýsla
J: Íslenskir starfsmenn á Keflavíkurflugvelli e. Icelandic employees at Keflavík airport (then US military airport)
JO: Erlendir starfsmenn á Keflavíkurflugvelli e. Foreign employees at Keflavík airport
K: Sauðárkrókskaupstaður og Skagafjarðarsýsla
L: Rangárvallasýsla
M: Mýra- og Borgarfjarðarsýsla
N: Neskaupstaður
Ó: Ólafsfjarðarkaupstaður
P: Snæfells- og Hnappadalssýsla
R: Reykjavík
S: Seyðisfjarðarkaupstaður og Norður-Múlasýsla
T: Strandasýsla
U: Suður-Múlasýsla
V: Vestmannaeyjakaupstaður
VL: Varnarliðið e. [US] defence force [in Iceland (now defunct)]
VLE: Ökutæki hermanna e. [US] soldier vehicle [in Iceland (now defunct)]
X: Árnessýsla
Y: Kópavogur
Z: Skaftafellssýsla
Þ: Þingeyjarsýsla
Ö: Keflavíkurkaupstaður
Ø: Keflavík (It is the only code that uses a letter not in the Icelandic alphabet.)

References

External links

Iceland
Road transport in Iceland
Iceland transport-related lists